"Lie to Me" is a hard rock song performed by rock artist, Poison lead singer and reality television star Bret Michaels, released in April 2010. The song was released as the second single for his 2010 solo album Custom Built (album) and features two versions, the clean radio version and an explicit version. The explicit version was a bonus track on the digital album  and the radio version was released on the album. No video was made for the song.

Background
The song is a hard rock song backed by a distorted guitar riff based on power chords and Bret's powerful vocals. Towards the end of the song after the solo, Bret comes in with a distorted vocal that he has utilized in previous songs. The story of the song revolves around lust (a theme similar to those found on Poison songs like Talk Dirty to Me and I Want Action).

Personnel 
 Bret Michaels - Lead Vocals, Rhythm Guitar, Background Vocals  
 Pete Evick - Lead Guitar, Background Vocals 
 Chuck Fanslau - Drums 
 Ray Scheuring - Bass 
 Rob Jozwaick - Keyboards

Additional Personnel
 Heidi Wheeler - Background Vocals

References   

2010 singles
Bret Michaels songs
American hard rock songs
Songs written by Bret Michaels
2010 songs